Ilkka Aaron Jääskeläinen (born 10 November 1979) is a singer who rose to popularity after winning Idols Finland 2, the Finnish version of Pop Idol with a 55% majority of the vote over runner-up Katri Ylander.

Jääskeläinen's debut album "Vuosisadan rakkaustarina" (transl. Love Story of the Century) was released in 2006. There has been two top singles in this disc, "Unohda en" (I Won't Forget) and "Soita" (Call).

Jääskeläinen was born in Hämeenlinna. He belongs to Tampere Pentecostal Church and has also made some Christian children's TV programs. He is known as a humoristic joker.

Jääskeläinen originally auditioned with his brother Heikki Jääskeläinen but Heikki only made the second day of the theatre round.

Idols Finland 2 performances
Tampere Auditions: Hero by Mariah Carey
Theatre Round Day 1: You're Still the One by Shania Twain
Semi Finals: The Power Of Love by Celine Dion
Top 7: I Was Made For Lovin" You by KISS
Top 6: Can't Stop Loving You by Van Halen
Top 5: 1972 by Anssi Kela
Top 5: Satuprinsessa by Tiktak
Top 4: Cherish by Kool & the Gang
Top 4: Stayin' Alive by Bee Gees
Top 3: Left Outside Alone by Anastacia
Top 3: Feel by Robbie Williams
Top 3: Taivas Lyö Tulta by Teräsbetoni
Grand Final: Unohda En
Grand Final: This Love by Maroon 5
Grand Final: The Power Of Love by Celine Dion
Grand Final: Please Forgive Me by Bryan Adams

Discography

Albums
Idols: Finalistit 2005 (December 2005)
Vuosisadan Rakkaustarina (March 2006)

Singles
Unohda en(2006)
Soita
Vuosisadan Rakkaustarina (2006)

References

External links
MTV3 Biography

1979 births
People from Hämeenlinna
Living people
Idols (TV series) winners
21st-century Finnish male singers
Finnish Pentecostals